Richard P. Loepfe (January 1, 1922 – October 31, 2010) was an American football offensive tackle in the National Football League for the Chicago Cardinals (1948–1949). He played at the collegiate level at the University of Wisconsin–Madison.

References

1922 births
2010 deaths
American football offensive tackles
Chicago Cardinals players
Wisconsin Badgers football players
Players of American football from Milwaukee